The Egyptian healthcare system is pluralistic, comprising a variety of healthcare providers from the public as well as the private sector. The government ensures basic universal health coverage, although private services are also available for those with the ability to pay. Due to social and economic pressures, Egypt's healthcare system is subject to many challenges. However, several recent efforts have been directed towards enhancing the system.

Healthcare system 
Healthcare in Egypt consists of both a public and a private sector. For several decades, the government has provided a subsidized healthcare system that is meant to ensure health care for those who cannot afford it. The system relies on four distinct financial agents, including the government and the public sector as well as private organizations and out-of-pocket payments made by individuals and families. Due to its pluralistic nature, healthcare providers from the various sectors compete. Therefore, patients have the liberty of choosing their doctor on the basis of their financial abilities.

Public healthcare 
Public health coverage is offered through the Ministry of Health, which operates a series of medical facilities providing free health services. There are two main quasi-governmental insurers. The Health Insurance Organization (HIO), is the largest public health-care payer, along with the Curative Care Organization (CCO). Their services are provided under the form of basic coverage. The HIO covers 60% of the population, including employees, students, and widows through premiums deducted from employee salaries and employer payrolls. The organization operates its own network of medical facilities and at times contracts with private healthcare providers. The Curative Care Organization (CCO) offers inpatient and outpatient care in specific governorate through contracts with other entities and individuals. Many mosques and churches also operate their own subsidized or free clinics, especially in the large cities.

The Universal Health Insurance project is a new mandatory health insurance system in Egypt, operating in accordance with Law No. 2 of 2018. It aims to replace the current health insurance system gradually thrugh diffusing into the country's governments. Its umbrella covers all citizens participating in the system. Universal Health Insurance differs from the Health Insurance Organization in that the family will be considered the main unit of insurance coverage within the system.  Another difference is that Universal Health Insurance is based on separating funding from service provision, and the Universal Health Insurance Authority may not provide treatment services or participate in providing them, but its role is to contract different health care providers (public or private) to provide services for the insured citizens.

Private healthcare 
There are also private insurance options and a network of private healthcare providers and medical facilities. The private sector includes for-profit clinics, hospitals, and pharmacies. The private medical sector is deemed superior to the public services, in terms of quality. Statistics show that the private sector is the initial choice of a healthcare provider in Egypt, even among the lowest income groups.

Challenges and shortcomings

Challenges
Egypt is now considered the second most highly populated country in the MENA region, with Cairo being among the world's most densely populated cities. The Egyptian population is relatively young, with 37% being children under the age of 15. The high population density, as well as increasing fertility rates, have challenged the healthcare system. High levels of pollution and overcrowding trigger health concerns. Egypt is a lower-middle-income country with high levels of unemployment. Despite the government's efforts to further the economy, 32.5% of Egyptians live in extreme poverty. With an increasing population and changing socioeconomic environment, Egypt faces great challenges in adapting to such developments in terms of healthcare facilities.

Shortcomings
Medical care offered by the public health insurance system is generally of poor quality. Although the system ensures basic universal coverage, it faces several shortcomings in terms of quality of service due to underfunding. Only 4.75% of the GDP in Egypt is dedicated to investments in healthcare services. Almost half of the public healthcare facilities have shortages of medical equipment and personnel. It is presumed that only 20% of the 660 government hospitals are committed to safety and infection control standards. Only about 6% of Egyptians covered by the Health Insurance Organization utilize its services due to dissatisfaction with the level of services it funds. In 2007/2008, 60% of health expenditure in Egypt was paid out of pocket by people seeking treatment. Excessive reliance on out-of-pocket financing of medical treatments creates inequalities of healthcare access. In 2007, more than 1/5th of the population struggled with catastrophic healthcare-related payments.
Additionally, there is a gap in terms of availability of medical services between the capital Cairo, and other rural areas.

Improvements 
During the past decade, the Egyptian healthcare system has improved in several aspects despite its pitfalls. By 2006, 95% of the population had access to primary healthcare within 5 km, and 98% of citizens were offered vaccinations.
Egypt is working on an overhaul of its public healthcare system to improve its quality. On 11 January 2018, the Ministry of Health and Population launched the National Health Insurance project and increased its expenditure on healthcare services. The project aimed at providing more regular checkups for citizens as well as improving the quality and efficiency of the system. The Universal Health Insurance Law also attempts to extend healthcare coverage to a wider portion of society, rather than on a case-by-case basis.

See also
 Health in Egypt
 List of medical schools in Egypt
 Waste management in Egypt

References

Healthcare in Egypt